Fellside Recordings is a British independent record label, formed by Paul Adams and Linda Adams in 1976 in Workington, Cumbria, and still run by them.

Paul Adams toured semi-professionally with the Barry Skinner Folk Group in his teens. He and Linda married in 1974. Fellside started as a folk music label. They issued jazz under the name LAKE, and children's records as "small folk". Most of the Fellside catalogue was recorded and produced by Paul Adams. In 2007, BBC radio celebrated the company with a programme called "30 Years of Fellside". Three of their acts, John Spiers & Jon Boden, Nancy Kerr & James Fagan, and Kirsty McGee were nominated for BBC Folk Awards, and two of the acts were winners on the night. The label has won many awards including 12 from the Music Retailers Association. LAKE has won a BT British Jazz Award and Paul Adams was nominated for a BBC Jazz Award.

The Amazon website lists over 130 titles still in print, including albums by Spiers and Boden, Nancy Kerr & James Fagan, Dr Faustus, 422, Fribo, Hughie Jones, A. L. Lloyd, Peter Bellamy, James Keelaghan, Clive Gregson, The Queensberry Rules, Jez Lowe, Last Orders, Bram Taylor, and Grace Notes. Their anthologies have included songs by Maddy Prior, Richard Thompson, Frankie Armstrong, John Kirkpatrick and Martin Carthy. Fellside, along with Topic Records, are the two most significant and longest serving record labels for traditional music in the UK.

On the jazz side, LAKE Records's roster includes George Melly, Digby Fairweather, Ottilie Patterson, Phil Mason, John Hallam, The Fryer-Barnhart International All Star Jazz Band, The Savannah Jazz Band, Spats Langham, Debbie Arthurs and Keith Nichols.

In 2004, they started reissuing recordings from the defunct jazz label Record Supervision. This included the reissue of albums by Humphrey Lyttelton, Acker Bilk, Alex Welsh, Ken Colyer, Chris Barber, Terry Lightfoot, Sandy Brown, and Archie Semple. Singsong described this set of reissues as "A milestone in British jazz". They have a "Vintage" Series as well as a series recorded at the Dancing Slipper Jazz Club in Nottingham in the 1960s.

Discography

LPs

 FE001 Terry Docherty – Teller of Tales. 1976
 FE002 The Best of BBC Radio Carlisle's Folk Workshop. 1976
 FE003 Geoff Purvis – The Border Fiddler. 1976
 FE004 Dave Walters – Comes Sailing in. 1977
 FE005 Farmstead – The Sheep & The Hay. 1977
 FE006 Paul & Linda Adams – Among the Old Familiar Mountains, 1978
 FE007 The Border Country Dance Band. 1977
 FE008 Robbie Ellis – Under Beacon's Brow. 1977
 FE009 Brian Dewhurst – Follow That With Your Sealions. 1977
 FE010 The Packmen's Blue Album. 1977
 FE011 Barry Skinner with Geoff Lakeman – Bushes & Briars. 1978
 FE012 The Wassailers. 1978
 FE013 Various Artists – Canny Cumberland. 1979
 FE014 Greg Stephens & Crookfinger Jack – The Beggar Boy of the North. 1979
 FE015 The Rockytops – Life Can Be Beautiful. 1978
 FE016 The Gateway Jazzband with George Chisholm. 1979
 FE017 Roy Harris – The Rambling Soldier. 1979
 FE018 Steve Turner – Outstack. 1979
 FE019 Woodbine Lizzie By Numbers. 1979
 FE020 The Border Dance Band at Gretna Hall. 1980
 FE021 Colin Thompson – Three Knights. 1980
 FE022 An Evening With Hoghton Band. 1980
 FE023 Jez Lowe. 1980
 FE024 Pat Knowles – Standard Settings. 1980
 FE025 A Night Out with Woodbine Lizzie. 1981
 FE026 Gerry Hallom – Travellin' Down the Castlereagh. 1981
 FE027 Martyn Wyndham–Read – Emu Plains. 1981
 FE028 Hoghton Band – Dance & Enjoy the Pride of Lancashire. 1981
 FE029 Rob Gordon's Fourth Caledonian Ball. 1982
 FE030 Steve Turner – Jigging One Now. 1982
 FE031 Sara Grey & Ellie Ellis – A Breath of Fresh Air. 1982
 FE032 Peter Bellamy – Keep On Kipling. 1982
 FE033 Bobby Eaglesham – Weather the Storm. 1982
 FE034 Jez Lowe – The Old Durham Road. 1983
 FE035 Jolly Jack – Rolling Down to Old Maui. 1983
 FE036 Gerry Hallom – A Run a Minute. 1983
 FE037 Swan Arcade – Together Forever. 1983
 FE038 Richard Grainger – Herbs On the Heart. 1984
 FE039 Sara Grey & Ellie Ellis – Making the Air Resound. 1984
 FE040 Hoghton Band Play Your Requests. 1984
 FE041 Bram Taylor – Bide A While. 1984
 FE042 Steve Turner – Eclogue. 1984
 FE043 Life & Times – Strawplait & Bonelace. 1984
 FE044 Roy Harris – Utter Simplicity. 1985
 FE045 Lancashire Fayre – Not Easily Forgotten. 1985
 FE046 Rhiannon – Birds of Rhiannon. 1985
 FE047 Linda Adams, John Bowden, Martin Carthy, Roy Harris, Jez Lowe – A Selection
from The Penguin Book of English Folk Songs. 1985
 FE048 Threeway Street – Drunkards & Lovers. 1985
 FE049 Jez Lowe – Galloways. 1985
 FE050 Various Artists – Flash Company. 1986
 FE051 Brian Peters – Persistence of Memory. 1985
 FE052 Mark T & The Brickbats – Johnny There. 1986
 FE053 Ian McGillivray – Rolling Home. 1986
 FE054 Swan Arcade – Diving for Pearls. 1986
 FE055 Jez Lowe & Jake Walton – Two a Roue. 1986
 FE056 Jill & Bernard Blackwell – Adventures of Notion. 1986
 FE057 Bram Taylor – Dreams & Songs to Sing. 1986
 FE058 Steve Turner – Braiding. 1987
 FE059 Anonyma – Burnt Feathers. 1987
 FE060 Ian Walker – Flying High. 1987
 FE061 Patti Reid. 1987
 FE062 Zydeco Ceilidh Band. 1987
 FE063 Ken Campbell – Going Solo. 1988
 FE064 Marilyn Middleton Pollock – Nobody Knows You. 1988
 FE065 Dave Goulder – The Man Who Put the Engine in the Chip Shop. 1988
 FE066 Alasdair Robertson – Friends & Companions. 1988
 FE067 Jolly Jack – A Long Time Travelling. 1988
 FE068 Bisiker & Romanov. 1988
 FE069 Strangefolk – Unhand Me You Bearded Loon. 1988
 FE070 Jez Lowe – Bad Penny. 1988
 FE071 Life & Times – Shropshire Iron. 1989
 FE072 Cockersdale – Doin' the Manch. 1989
 FE073 Ian Walker – Shadows in Time. 1989
 FE074 Gerry Hallom – Old Australian Ways. 1989
 FE075 Bram Taylor – Taylor Made. 1989
 FE077 Phil Hare – Living On Credit. 1990
 FE079 Jez Lowe & The Bad Pennies – Briefly On the Street. 1990

CDs (up to FECD100)

 FECD3 Geoff Purvis – The Border Fiddler
 FECD27 Martyn Wyndham-Read – Emu Plains 25th Anniversary Reissue Series
 FECD34 Jez Lowe – The Old Durham Road
 FECD47 Linda Adams, John Bowden, Martin Carthy, Roy Harris, Jez Lowe – A Selection From The Penguin Book of English Folk Songs. 1985
 FECD61 Patti Reid. 1987
 FECD70 Jez Lowe – Bad Penny
 FECD72 Cockersdale – Doin' the Manch 25th Anniversary Reissue Series
 FECD76 Ian Bruce – Blodwen's Dream. 1990
 FECD78 Classic Anne Briggs. 1990
 FECD79 Jez Lowe & The Bad Pennies – Briefly On the Street. 1990
 FECD80 Gill Bowman – City Love. 1990
 FECD81 Hughie Jones – Hughie's Ditty Bag. 1991
 FECD82 Hamish Bayne & Martin Cole – Making Music. 1991
 FECD83 Mick Bisiker – Home Again. 1991
 FECD84 Martyn Wyndham-Read – Mussels On a Tree. 1991
 FECD85 Ian Bruce – Out of Office. 1992
 FECD86 Marilyn Middleton Pollock – A Doll's House. 1992
 FECD87 Various Artists – Voices, English Traditional Songs. 1992
 FECD88 Ian Walker & Setanta – Crossing the Borderlines. 1993
 FECD89 Jez Lowe – Backshift. 1992
 FECD90 The Paul Brennan Band – Fire in the Soul. 1993
 FECD91 Wizz & Simeon Jones – Late Nights & Long Days. 1993
 FECD92 Bram Taylor – Further Horizons. 1993
 FECD93 Christine Kydd – Heading Home. 1993
 FECD94 Jez Lowe & The Bad Pennies – Bede Weeps. 1993
 FECD95 The Ragtime Millionaires – Making A Million. 1993
 FECD96 Edgerton Layhe – Rough & Tumble. 1993
 FECD97 John Wright – Ride the Rolling Skies. 1993
 FECD98 Classic A. L. Lloyd. 1994
 FECD99 Heather Innes – Coanineadh, Songs from the Heart. 1994
 FECD100 Various Artists – Banklands (The Story of Fellside Records). 1994

CDs (FECD101 to FECD200)

 FECD101 Cockersdale – Been Around for Years. 1994
 FECD102 Martyn Wyndham–Read – Sunlit Plains. 1994
 FECD103 Pete Oakley – Ghost in the City. 1995
 FECD104 Sisters Unlimited – No Bed of Roses. 1995
 FECD105 Classic Peggy Seeger ft Tom Paley. 1996
 FECD106 The John Wright Band – The Things We've Handed Down. 1996
 FECD107 Sandra & Nancy Kerr – Neat and Complete. 1996
 FECD108 Dick Wardell – Street Life Blues. 1996
 FECD109 The Ragtime Millionaires – Life Is Good Sometimes. 1996
 FECD110 Various Artists – Ballads. 1997
 FECD111 Bob Fox & Benny Graham – How Are You Off for Coals? 1996
 FECD112 Lucky Bags – Food for Thought. 1996
 FECD113 The Rufus Crisp Experience (Dave Arthur & Barry Murphy) – Chickens Are A–Crowing. 1997
 FECD114 Rick Kemp – Escape. 1997
 FECD115 Martyn Wyndham–Read – Beneath a Southern Sky. 1997
 FECD116 Frankie Armstrong with John Kirkpatrick & Maddy Prior – Till the Grass O'ergrew the Corn. 1997
 FECD117 Gordeanna McCulloch – Sheath & Knife. 1997
 FECD118 Keith Kendrick – Home Ground. 1997
 FECD119 Voice Union (Liliana Bertolo, Evelyne Girardon, Sandra Kerr with special guest Maddy Prior). 1997
 FECD120 Bram Taylor – Pick of the Grinner. 1997
 FECD121 The John Wright Band – Other Roads. 1997
 FECD122 Bob Davenport & The Rakes – The Red Haired Lad. 1997
 FECD123 Cockersdale – Wide Open Skies. 1997
 FECD124 Bob Fox & Stu Luckley – Box of Gold. 1997
 FECD125 John Kirkpatrick & Others – Wassail! 1997
 FECD126 Grace Notes – Red Wine & Promises. 1998
 FECD127 Nancy Kerr & James Fagan – Starry Gazy Pie. 1997
 FECD128 Keith Hills – Recovery. 1997
 FECD129 Gordon Tyrrall – A Distance from the Town. 1998
 FECD130 Peggy Seeger with Irene Scott – Almost Commercially Viable. 1998
 FECD131 Various Artists – Fyre & Sworde, Songs of the Border Reivers. 1998
 FECD132 Ushna – Twice Brewed. 1998
 FECD133 Rick Kemp – Spies. 1998
 FECD134 Steve Tilston – Solorubato. 1998
 FECD135 John Conolly & Pete Sumner – Trawlertown. 1998
 FECD136 Simon Haworth – Coast to Coast. 1998
 FECD137 Sandra Kerr, Nancy Kerr & James Fagan – Scalene. 1999
 FECD138 Lucky Bags – Delight in Disorder. 1999
 FECD139 Buz Collins – Water and Rain. 1999
 FECD140 Jolly Jack & Others – Rolling Down to Old Maui. 1999
 FECD141 Clive Gregson – Happy Hour. 1999
 FECD142 Kathy Stewart – Celestial Shoes. 1999
 FECD143 Johnny Silvo & Diz Disley – Blues in the Back Yard. 1999
 FECD144 Frankie Armstrong – Garden of Love. 1999
 FECD145 Nancy Kerr & James Fagan – Steely Water. 1999
 FECD146 Martyn Wyndham–Read and No Man's Band – Beyond the Red Horizon. 1999
 FECD147 Hughie Jones – Seascape. 1999
 FECD148 The Bram Taylor Collection – Singing! 1999
 FECD149 Mad Pudding – Grand Hotel. 1999
 FECD150 Tryckster – When the Stone Is Exposed. 1999
 FECD151 Frankie Armstrong – Lovely On the Water. 2000
 FECD152 Sandra Kerr – Yellow, Red and Gold. 2000
 FECD153 422 – One. 2000
 FECD154 Alistair McCulloch – Highly Strung. 2000
 FECD155 Peta Webb & Ken Hall – As Close As Can Be. 2000
 FECD156 Various – Flash Company Celebration 25 years Fellside 1976–2001, 25th Anniversary Reissue Series.
 FECD157 Martyn Wyndham–Read and No Man's Band – Where Ravens Feed. 2001
 FECD158 Various Artists – Voices in Harmony, English Traditional Songs. 2001
 FECD159 Bram Taylor – Fragile Peace. 2001
 FECD160 Swan Arcade – Round Again 25th Anniversary Reissue Series. 2001
 FECD161 John Spiers & Jon Boden – Through and Through. 2001
 FECD162 Peter Bellamy – Mr Bellamy, Mr Kipling and the Tradition 25th Anniversary Reissue Series. 2001
 FECD163 Grace Notes – Anchored to the Time. 2001
 FECD164 Clive Gregson – Comfort & Joy. 2001
 FECD165 Little Johnny England. 2001
 FECD166 Little Johnny England – Merc & Cherokees. 2001
 FECD167 Nancy Kerr & James Fagan – Between the Dark and Light. 2002
 FECD168 Altar Native – Cumbria Odyssey. 2002
 FECD169 Clive Gregson – Carousel of Noise. 2002
 FECD170 Kirsty McGee – Honeysuckle. 2002
 FECD171 422 – New Numbers. 2003
 FECD172 Simon Haworth – Taking Routes. 2003
 FECD173 A.L. Lloyd – England & Her Traditional Songs. 2003
 FECD174 Andy May – The Yellow Haired Laddie (Northumbrian Smallpipes). 2003
 FECD175 John Spiers & Jon Boden – Bellow. 2003
 FECD176D Various Artists – Song Links, A Celebration of English Traditional Songs and their Australian variants
 FECD177 Dr Faustus – The First Cut. 2003
 FECD178 FolkESTRA North. 2003
 FECD179 Alistair McCulloch – Wired Up. 2003
 FECD180 The Witches of Elswick – Out of Bed. 2003
 FECD181 Benji Kirkpatck – Half a Fruit Pie. 2004
 FECD182 Various Artists – Fanfare for the South West. 2003
 FECD183 Bram Taylor – The Night Is Young. 2004
 FECD184 Clive Gregson – Long Story Short. 2004
 FECD185 Ed Rennie – Narrative. 2004
 FECD186 Jon Loomes – Fearful Symmetry. 2005
 FECD187 Peter Bellamy – Fair Annie. 2004
 FECD188 The Hoghton Band Collection – A Selection of English Country Dances. 2005
 FECD189 Dr Faustus – Wager. 2005
 FECD190D Various Artists – Song Links 2, A Celebration of English Traditional Songs and their American variants. 2005
 FECD191 422 – Major Third. 2005
 FECD192 Spiers & Boden – Tunes. 2005
 FECD193 Maddie Southorn – The Pilgrim Soul. 2005
 FECD194 Spiers & Boden – Songs. 2005
 FECD195 Kieron Means – Far As My Eyes Can See. 2005
 FECD196 Sara Grey – A Long Way From Home. 2005
 FECD197 Martyn Wyndham–Read and No Man's Band – Oceans in the Sky. 2005
 FECD198 Hughie Jones & Friends – Liverpool Connexions. 2005
 FECD199 Nancy Kerr & James Fagan – Strands of Gold. 2006
 FECD200 James Keelaghan – Then Again. 2006

CDs (from FECD201)

 FECD201 The Queensberry Rules – The Black Dog & Other Stories. 2006
 FECD202 Tom Kitching & Gren Bartley – Rushes 2007
 FECD203 Landmarks – 30 Years of Fellside Recording (3 CDs) 2006
 FECD204 James Keelaghan – A Few Simple Verses 2006
 FECD205 Fribo – The Ha' o' Habrahellia 2009
 FECD206 Bram Taylor – Song Singer 206
 FECD207 Last Orders 2007
 FECD208 Frankie Armstrong – Encouragement 2007
 FECD209 Grace Notes – Northern Tide 2007
 FECD210 The Queensberry Rules – Landlocked 2007
 FECD211 Kerr Fagan Harbron – Station House 2008
 FECD212 Crucible – Love & Money 2008
 FECD213 Jack McNeill & Charlie Heys – Light Up All the Beacons 2008
 FECD214 The Maerlock – Sofa 2008
 FECD215 Rachel & Lillias – Dear Someone 2008
 FECD216 Peter Bellamy – Fair England's Shore (Double CD) 2008
 FECD217 Phil Hulse – Unpredicted Storm 2008
 FECD218 Graham & Sam Pirt – Dance Ti Thee Daddy 2008
 FECD219 A.L. Lloyd – Ten Thousand Miles (Double CD) 2008
 FECD220 A.L. Lloyd – An Evening with ... 2010
 FECD221 Dave Goulder – The Golden Age of Steam 2008
 FECD222 Tom Kitching & Gren Bartley – Boundary 2009
 FECD223 Elbow Jane – 3–Side Island 2009
 FECD224 Andy May – Happy Hours 2009
 FECD225 Sara Grey – Sandy Boys 2009
 FECD226 Ken Campbell's Ideal Band 2009
 FECD227 The Queensberry Rules – Take Your Own Roads 2009
 FECD228 The Hut People (Sam Pirt & Gary Hammond) – Home Is Where the Hut Is 2009
 FECD229 Jack McNeill & Charlie Heys – The Northern Road 2009
 FECD230 Wendy Weatherby – A Shirt of Silk or Snow 2009
 FECD231 Joseph Topping – Ghosts in the Shadows 2010
 FECD232 Lizzie Nunnery – Company of Ghosts 2010
 FECD233 The Urban Folk Quartet 2011
 FECD234 Suntrap – Unravelling 2010
 FECD235 Ewan McLennan – Rags & Robes 2010
 FECD236 All Along the Wall – Various artists 2010
 FECD237 422 – Go Forth 2010
 FECD238 James Findlay – Sport and Play 2011
 FECD239 Pilgrims' Way – Wayside Courtesies 2011
 FECD240 AL Lloyd – Bramble Briars and Beams of the Sun 2011
 FECD241 Hedy West – Ballads and Songs from the Appalachians 2011
 FECD242 Elbow Jane – The Boldest Blood 2011
 FECD243 Martin & Carthy & Dave Swarbrick – Walnut Creek 2011
 FECD244 Fiona Cuthill & Stevie Lawrence – A Cruel Kindness 2011
 FECD245 Jack McNeill & Charlie Heys – Two Fine Days 2012
 FECD246 Bram Taylor – Jokers & Rogues 2012
 FECD247 Gren Bartley – Songs to Scythe Back the Overgrown 2012
 FECD248 The Hut People – Picnic 2012
 FECD249 Grace Notes – 20 2012
 FECD250 Ewan McLennan – The Last Bird to Sing 2012
 FECD251 Greg Russell and Ciaran Algar – The Queen's Lover 2012
 FECD252 James Findlay – Another Day Another Story 2012
 FECD253 Peter Bellamy – Barrack Room Ballads 2012
 FECD254 Hadrian's Union – In Your Own Time 2012
 FECD255 Joe Tilson – Embers 2012
 FECD256 Gren Bartley – Winter Fires 2013
 FECD257 James Findlay, Bella Hardy, Brian Peters, Lucy Ward – The Liberty to Choose – A Selection of Songs from
The New Penguin Book of English Folk Songs 2013
 FECD258 Hughie Jones – Maritime Miscellany 2013
 FECD259 Sara Grey with Kieron Means – Down in Old Dolores 2013
 FECD260 A.L. Lloyd – Turtle Dove 2013
 FECD261 Pete Morton – The Frappin' and Ramblin' Pete Morton 2014
 FECD262 Greg Russell and Ciaran Algar – The Call 2014
 FECD263 Ewan McLennan – Stories Still Untold 2014
 FECD264 The Hut People – Cabinet of Curiosities 2014
 FECD265 Joe Topping – The Vagrant Kings 2014
 FECD266 Jimmy Aldridge & Sid Goldsmith – Let the Wind Blow High or Low 2014
 FECD267 Tom Kitching – Interloper 2015
 FECD268 Gren Bartley – Magnificent Creatures 2015
 FECD269 Pete Morton – The Land of Time 2015
 FECD270 Ciaran Algar – The Final Waltz 2016
 FECD271 Pete Morton with Full House – Game of Life 2016
 FECD272 The Journey Continues...Fellside at 40 (1976 – 2016) [3 CDs] 2016
 FECD273 Pete Seeger in England 2016 [2 CDs - recorded London 1958 and Manchester 1964]
 FECD274 Pilgrims' Way – Red Diesel 2016
 FECD275 Greg Russell and Ciaran Algar – The Silent Majority 2016
 FECD276 Vic Gammon & Friends - Early Scottish Ragtime 2016
 FECD277 Ewan McLennan & George Monbiot - Breaking The Spell Of Loneliness 2016
 FECD278 Jimmy Aldridge & Sid Goldsmith – Night Hours 2016
 FECD279 Emily Sanders, Chris Parkinson & Pete Morton – The Magical Christmas Tree 2016
 FECD280 The Hut People – Routes 2017
 FECD281 Ciaran Algar - Inclined To Be Red 2017
 FECD282 Destination: Fellside Recordings 1976 - 2018. The end of an era for a leading folk music label [3 CDs] - 2018
 FECD283 Rick Kemp - Perfect Blue 2018
 FECD284 Peter Bellamy - The Maritime Suite 2018 [Reissue of 1982 cassette + 5 bonus tracks]
 FECD285 Various Artists - Strings That Nimbly Leap: Fylde Guitars And Their Players
 FECD286 Jez Lowe - The Jez Lowe Fellside Collection [Reissue of 6 Jez Lowe Fellside albums + 9 bonus tracks] [5 CDs]

The Tradition Masters
 Johnny Collins: The Best of the Early Years (FTSR1) 1998
 Trip to Harrogate: Tunes & Songs From Joshua Jackson's Book, 1798 (various artists) (FTSR2) 1999
 Enlist for a Soldier: The Soldier in Song From the English Civil War to the Falklands (various artists) (FTSR3) 2002
 The Bold Navigators: The Story of England's Canals in Song (various artists) (FTSR4) 1999
 Seasons, Ceremonies & Rituals: The Calendar in Traditional Song (various artists) (FTSR5) 2002

Jazz albums on LAKE
 The Controversial Bruce Turner: That's the Blues, Dad (LACD49)
 The Great Revival: Traditional Jazz 1949–1958 (various artists) (LACD136)
 The Great Revival: Traditional Jazz 1949–1958 Vol. 4 (various artists) (LACD137)
 The Great Revival: Traditional Jazz 1949–1958 Vol. 5 (various artists) (LACD158)
 Bruce Turner Jump Band: Jumpin' for Joy (LACD159)
 Dutch Swing College Band: Vintage Vol. 1 1948–1949 (LACD177)
 Bruce Turner: The Jump Band Collection (LACD184)
 Ken Colyer's Jazzmen: New Orleans to London & Back to the Delta (LACD209)
 Chris Barber's Jazz Band: International Classic Concerts (LAVCD210D) (double album)
 T.J. Johnson: TJ Johnson Presents Bourbon Kick (LACD214)
 Alex Welsh and His Band: Echoes of Chicago (LACD215)
 Humphry Lyttelton & his Band: Blues in the Night (LACD216)
 Sims Wheen Vintage Jazz: Band High Spirits (LACD217)
 Acker Bilk & The Stan Tracey Big Brass: Blue Acker (LACD218)
 Chris Barber's Jazz Band: Best Yet! (LACD219)
 Chris Barber's Jazz Band: Jazz Sacred and Secular (LACD222)
 Ruby Braff with Alex Welsh & His Band: Ruby Braff with Alex Welsh & His Band (LACD223)
 Monty Sunshine's Jazz Band: A Jazz Club Session (LACD224)
 Harry Gold & His Pieces of Eight: Bouncing Back (LACD225)
 Spats Langham & Martin Litton: Lollipops (LACD226)
 Buck Clayton with Humphry Little & His Band: Le Vrai Buck Clayton (LACD227)
 Ken Colyer's Jazzmen & Skiffle Group: Ken Colyer 1956 (LACD241)
 Chris Barber's Jazz Band: Chris Barber 1956 (LACD246)
 The Traditional Jazz Clarinet Collection (various artists) (LACS2)
 The Traditional Jazz New Orleans Collection (various artists) (LACS4)

Themed albums
Voices: English Traditional Songs (various artists) (FECD87)
Rolling Down to Old Maui (various artists) (FECD140)
A Celebration of English Traditional Songs and their Australian variants (various artists) (FECD176D, double album)
A Celebration of English Traditional Songs and their American variants (various artists) (FECD190D, double album)
Trip to Harrowgate (various artists) (FTSR2)
Enlist for a Soldier (various artists) (FTSR3)
The Bold Navigators (various artists) (FTSR4)
Seasons, Ceremonies & Rituals (various artists) (FTSR5)

See also
 List of record labels

References

External links
 
 
 
 

British record labels
Organisations based in Cumbria
Record labels established in 1976
Folk record labels
Jazz record labels
1976 establishments in England